Michael Wayne Young (born January 2, 1961) is an American retired professional basketball player. He had a 15-year playing career spent in the National Basketball Association (NBA) and overseas. He was most recently the director of basketball operations and performance enhancement at the University of Houston, his alma mater.

College career 
Young, a native Houstonian, played basketball at Yates High School and the University of Houston. With the Houston Cougars, he was part of Phi Slama Jama and was twice named to the Southwest Conference First Team. He played in the 1983 NCAA Final, a loss to the North Carolina State Wolfpack, as well as the 1984 final, a loss to the Georgetown Hoyas.

Professional career

NBA and CBA 
Michael Young was selected by the Boston Celtics with the 24th overall pick (1st round) of the 1984 NBA draft.

He played in three NBA seasons: 1984–85 with the Phoenix Suns, 1985–86 with the Philadelphia 76ers, and 1989–90 with the Los Angeles Clippers. He also played two seasons with the Continental Basketball Association's Detroit Spirit, where he was named the CBA's Player of the Year in 1986 after averaging 26 points per game.

Overseas 
Young also played in the Philippines, Spain, Italy, France and Israel. In 1986, he led Manila Beer to the finals of the Philippine Basketball Association Open Conference, losing to the Ginebra San Miguel team led by Billy Ray Bates.  Young, however, won Best Import honors over the highly favored Bates.  He would return the following year, this time with the Great Taste Coffee Makers, which he led to another runner-up finish to Tanduay Rhum, led by David Thirdkill. While with the French League's Limoges, he won the 1993 European Club Championship, the EuroLeague.

Post-playing career
Young concluded his playing career in 1998 before returning to the University of Houston. He spent one season as an assistant men's basketball coach and five years as Houston's strength and conditioning coach. He then became the director of basketball operations and performance enhancement.

Personal life
Young earned a bachelor's degree from the University of Houston in 2002. He and his wife, Tina, have five children: Michael Jr., Joe, Mayorca, Jacob and Milan Maria. Joe played college basketball for Houston and Oregon and followed his father's footsteps to the NBA in 2015 as a member of the Indiana Pacers. His youngest son, Jacob Young, played at the University of Texas and Rutgers before also transferring to Oregon.

See also
 List of second-generation NBA players

References

External links
 
College and NBA stats from basketballreference.com

1961 births
Living people
21st-century African-American people
African-American basketball players
All-American college men's basketball players
American expatriate basketball people in France
American expatriate basketball people in Israel
American expatriate basketball people in Italy
American expatriate basketball people in Spain
American expatriate basketball people in the Philippines
American men's basketball players
Basket CRO Lyon players
Basketball players from Houston
Boston Celtics draft picks
CB Valladolid players
Detroit Spirits players
Fabriano Basket players
Great Taste Coffee Makers players
Houston Cougars men's basketball coaches
Houston Cougars men's basketball players
Israeli Basketball Premier League players
Lega Basket Serie A players
Liga ACB players
Limoges CSP players
Los Angeles Clippers players
Maccabi Givat Shmuel players
Manila Beer Brewmasters players
Pallalcesto Amatori Udine players
Philadelphia 76ers players
Philippine Basketball Association imports
Phoenix Suns players
Shooting guards
Sioux Falls Skyforce (CBA) players
Small forwards
Viola Reggio Calabria players
20th-century African-American sportspeople